On 5 May 2011, one-third of seats on Thurrock Council were contested. The result of the election was that Thurrock Council stayed under no overall control. The Labour Party gained one seat from the Conservative party.

Results
Of the 16 wards that were contested, nine were won by Labour, six by the Conservatives and one by an independent.

Council Composition
After the election the composition of the council was:

Following the election the vote for mayor was tied between Cllr Curtis and deputy mayor Cllr Tunde Ojetola. Outgoing Mayor Anne Cheale exercised her casting vote in favour of Councillor Curtis. In the election for council leader, Councillor Curtis then used his casting vote to elect John Kent as council leader, thus maintaining the Labour administration.

Results by ward
Each of the 16 wards elected one councillor for this election. Incumbent councillors are marked by an asterisk.

Aveley & Uplands

Belhus

Chadwell St. Mary

Chafford & North Stifford

Corringham & Fobbing

East Tilbury

Grays Riverside

Grays Thurrock

Little Thurrock Rectory

Ockendon

Stanford East & Corringham Town

Stanford-Le-Hope West

Stifford Clays

The Homesteads

Tilbury Riverside & Thurrock Park

West Thurrock & South Stifford

See also
Politics of the United Kingdom

References

2011
2011 English local elections
2010s in Essex